Niedensteiner Kopf is a hill of Schwalm-Eder-Kreis, Hesse, Germany.

Hills of Hesse